Tocci is an Italian surname. Notable people with the surname include:

C. Lee Tocci, American writer
Carlos Tocci, baseball player
Giacomo and Giovanni Battista Tocci, Italian conjoined twins
Ronald Tocci, American politician
Terenzio Tocci (1880–1945), Italian politician

See also
Tocci Glacier, glacier of Victoria Land, Antarctica

Italian-language surnames